The R556 road is a regional road in Ireland, linking Tralee and Abbeydorney before joining up with the R551 at Glanerdalliv Bridge in County Kerry.

Route
It starts in the centre of Tralee at the junction of Pembroke Street and Rock Street and continues to Abbeydorney and Ballinclogher Cross where it terminates upon meeting the R551 at Glanerdalliv Bridge. The R551 then continues to Ballyduff, Ballybunion, Ballylongford and Tarbert.

See also
Roads in Ireland
National primary road
National secondary road

References
Roads Act 1993 (Classification of Regional Roads) Order 2006 – Department of Transport

Regional roads in the Republic of Ireland
Roads in County Kerry